Elio Cruz  (1931 – 14 June 2019) was a Gibraltarian playwright, who composed both in English and in Llanito. Cruz co-founded the Theatre Group 56 with Luis Azzopardi and Cecil Gomez. Cruz penned two of the most successful plays staged in Gibraltar: La Lola se va pa Londre and Connie con cama camera en el comedor, both in the 1960s.

Cruz died on 14 June 2019 at the age of 87.

Plays 

 La Lola se va pa Londre (1966): comedy in two parts and seven acts
 Connie con cama camera en el comedor (1969): comedy in two parts and ten acts
 Cuando la Lola regrese de Londres

Bibliography 

 Fierro Cubiella, Eduardo (1997). Gibraltar, aproximación a un estudio sociolingüístico y cultural de la Roca. Cádiz: Universidad, Servicio de Publicaciones. P. 77.

References

External links 

 Un oasis en el desierto 

1931 births
2019 deaths
Gibraltarian writers